Henry Aaron may refer to:

Hank Aaron, Henry Louis Aaron, (1934–2021), American baseball player
Henry J. Aaron (born 1936), American economist

See also